Lithuanian Player of the Year is a football award.

Winners
 1965: Petras Glodenis ( Žalgiris Vilnius)
 1966: Gintautas Kalėdinskas ( Žalgiris Vilnius)
 1967: Stanislovas Ramelis ( Žalgiris Vilnius)
 1968: Stanislovas Ramelis ( Žalgiris Vilnius)
 1969: Juzefas Jurgelevičius ( Žalgiris Vilnius)
 1970: Romualdas Juška ( Žalgiris Vilnius)
 1971: Benjaminas Zelkevičius ( Žalgiris Vilnius)
 1972: Benjaminas Zelkevičius ( Žalgiris Vilnius)
 1973: Petras Glodenis ( Žalgiris Vilnius)
 1974: Algirdas Žilinskas ( Žalgiris Vilnius)
 1975: Vytautas Dirmeikis ( Žalgiris Vilnius)
 1976: Eugenijus Riabovas ( Žalgiris Vilnius)
 1977: Eugenijus Riabovas ( Žalgiris Vilnius)
 1978: Eugenijus Riabovas ( Žalgiris Vilnius)
 1979: Stanislovas Danisevičius ( Žalgiris Vilnius)
 1980: Juzefas Jurgelevičius ( Žalgiris Vilnius)
 1981: Vytautas Dirmeikis ( Žalgiris Vilnius)
 1982: Sigitas Jakubauskas ( Žalgiris Vilnius)
 1983: Valdas Kasparavičius ( Žalgiris Vilnius)
 1984: Stanislovas Danisevičius ( Žalgiris Vilnius)
 1985: Arminas Narbekovas ( Žalgiris Vilnius)
 1986: Arminas Narbekovas ( Žalgiris Vilnius)
 1987: Arminas Narbekovas ( Žalgiris Vilnius)
 1988: Arminas Narbekovas ( Žalgiris Vilnius)
 1989: Valdemaras Martinkėnas ( Žalgiris Vilnius)
 1990: Valdas Ivanauskas ( Austria Wien)
 1991: Valdas Ivanauskas ( Austria Wien)
 1992: Valdemaras Martinkėnas ( Dynamo Kiev)
 1993: Valdas Ivanauskas ( Hamburger SV)
 1994: Valdas Ivanauskas ( Hamburger SV)
 1995: Gintaras Staučė ( Karşıyaka SK)
 1996: Gintaras Staučė ( Sarıyer GK)
 1997: Edgaras Jankauskas ( Club Brugge)
 1998: Edgaras Jankauskas ( Club Brugge)
 1999: Saulius Mikalajūnas ( Uralan Elista)
 2000: Edgaras Jankauskas ( Real Sociedad)
 2001: Edgaras Jankauskas ( Real Sociedad)
 2002: Raimondas Žutautas ( Maccabi Haifa FC)
 2003: Robertas Poškus ( Krylya Sovetov Samara)
 2004: Edgaras Jankauskas ( OGC Nice)
 2005: Deividas Šemberas ( PFC CSKA Moscow)
 2006: Tomas Danilevičius ( AS Livorno Calcio)
 2007: Tomas Danilevičius ( Bologna FC 1909)
 2008: Marius Stankevičius ( UC Sampdoria)
 2009: Marius Stankevičius ( UC Sampdoria)
 2010: Darvydas Šernas ( Widzew Łódź)
 2011: Žydrūnas Karčemarskas ( Gaziantepspor)
 2012: Žydrūnas Karčemarskas ( Gaziantepspor)
 2013: Mindaugas Kalonas ( Baku FC)
 2014: Giedrius Arlauskis ( Steaua București)
 2015: Lukas Spalvis ( Aalborg BK)
 2016: Fiodor Černych ( Jagiellonia Białystok)
 2017: Fiodor Černych ( Jagiellonia Białystok)
 2018: Arvydas Novikovas ( Jagiellonia Białystok)
 2019: Ernestas Šetkus  ( Hapoel Be'er Sheva)
 2020: Arvydas Novikovas ( Legia Warsaw &  BB Erzurumspor)
 2021: Arvydas Novikovas ( BB Erzurumspor)
 2022: Edvinas Gertmonas ( Žalgiris Vilnius)

External links
 uefa.com

Association football player of the year awards by nationality
Awards established in 1965
Footballer
1965 establishments in Lithuania
Lithuanian awards
Annual events in Lithuania
Association football player non-biographical articles